Gibberula adzubae is a species of sea snail, a marine gastropod mollusk, in the family Cystiscidae. It is named after Caddy Adzuba.

Description
The length of the shell attains 2.4 mm.

Distribution
This species occurs in Guadeloupe.

References

adzubae
Gastropods described in 2015